Mark Thomson is a Professor of Experimental Particle Physics at the Cavendish Laboratory at the University of Cambridge and a Fellow at Emmanuel College, Cambridge. In January 2018 he was announced as the new Executive Chair of the Science and Technology Facilities Council.

He works on the Deep Underground Neutrino Experiment, MicroBooNE and the MINOS experiment, amongst others, having previously worked on the OPAL experiment at LEP. He is the author of the 2013 book Modern particle physics.

Thomson completed a B.A and DPhil in Physics at the University of Oxford. His DPhil was supervised by John H. Cobb and his thesis was entitled "An experimental study of the possible association of deep underground muons with astronomical point sources".

References 

Year of birth missing (living people)
Living people
Scientists of the Cavendish Laboratory
Alumni of the University of Oxford
Fellows of Emmanuel College, Cambridge